Douglas Keith Beckett (born 9 August 1959) is a former English cricketer. Beckett was a right-handed batsman who bowled right-arm medium pace. He was born at Hampton, Middlesex.

Beckett made his debut in county cricket for Cheshire against Staffordshire in the 1978 Minor Counties Championship. He made nine further Minor Counties Championship appearances for the county, the last of which came against Durham in 1979. It was in 1979 that Beckett was selected to play for Minor Counties North in the 1979 Benson & Hedges Cup, making a single List A appearance against Nottinghamshire. The following season he joined Lancashire, making his debut for the county in a List A match against Worcestershire in the 1980 Gillette Cup. He made six further List A appearances for Lancashire, the last of which came against Gloucestershire in the 1981 John Player League. In his seven List A matches for the county, he scored 77 runs at an average of 12.83, with a high score of 30. With the ball, he took 2 wickets at a bowling average of 18.00, with best figures of 2/23. He made no appearances in first-class cricket for Lancashire.

References

External links
Douglas Beckett at ESPNcricinfo
Douglas Beckett at CricketArchive

1959 births
Living people
People from Hampton, London
English cricketers
Cheshire cricketers
Minor Counties cricketers
Lancashire cricketers